The Château de Pestillac is a ruined 12th century castle on a site which also includes the ruins of a church. It is located in the commune of Montcabrier in the Lot département of France.

The site is privately owned. It has been listed since 1926 as a monument historique by the French Ministry of Culture.

See also
List of castles in France

References

External links
 

Castles in Lot
Monuments historiques of Lot (department)